Elections to Cannock Chase District Council took place on 2 May 2019 on the same day as other local elections in England, including to several parish councils in the district. All of the council's wards were up for election, meaning a total of 15 councillors were elected.

Before the election, the Labour Party held control of the council with 21 seats, a majority of one. They were aiming to defend the six seats they won at the 2015 election as well as another in Hednesford Green Heath which they gained at a by-election in September 2017. Labour lost four of the seven seats they were defending and only gained one, meaning they lost their overall majority on the council. Four Labour candidates stood as joint Labour and Co-operative candidates and one was elected adding to the three councillors who also represented the Co-operative Party on the council.

The Conservatives had previously strengthened their position as the largest opposition group on the council at the previous elections and maintained their total of 15 seats. They lost one seat to the Green Party and another to Labour but also gained two seats from Labour, including one of the Hednesford seats they lost in the 2017 by-elections.

The Green Party had not won any seats in 2015 but went on to gain one seat in 2016, one seat in the 2017 by-elections and another in 2018. They retained their by-election seat and gained two seats, one from Labour and another from the Conservatives, to take their total up to five seats.

The Liberal Democrats only fielded two candidates this year: one in Brereton & Ravenhill and one in Rawnsley, both former strongholds of theirs. They succeeded in regaining Brereton & Ravenhill which they had lost to Labour in 2015. UKIP stood in six wards and increased their share of the vote compared to 2018 but did not gain any seats. Two independent candidates also stood but neither were elected.

Results

|}

Council Composition
Prior to the election, the composition of the council was:

After the election, the composition of the council was:

Ward results
Vote share changes are based on the results achieved by parties in 2015 election when these seats were last contested, except from the Hednesford Green Heath and Hednesford South wards which were last contested at by-elections in 2017.

Brereton and Ravenhill

Cannock East

Cannock North

Cannock South

Cannock West

Etching Hill and the Heath

Hagley

Hawks Green

Heath Hayes East & Wimblebury

Hednesford Green Heath

`a

^ Linda Tait was the sitting councillor for the Hednesford Green Heath ward after gaining it from the Conservatives in a 2017 by-election. Changes to vote shares, turnout and swing is compared with the by-election, not the 2015 election.

Hednesford North

Hednesford South

^ Stuart Crabtree was the sitting councillor for the Hednesford South ward after gaining it from the Conservatives in a 2017 by-election. Changes to vote shares, turnout and swing is compared with the by-election, not the 2015 election.

Norton Canes

Rawnsley

Western Springs

References

2019 English local elections
2019
2010s in Staffordshire
May 2019 events in the United Kingdom